The episodes of Golgo 13 are based on the manga of the same name, which had aired in Spring 2008, but were re-imagined to fit current real-world synchronism. The first episode aired in Japanese on April 11, 2008 with Japanese television actor Hiroshi Tachi playing the role of Duke Togo. The series is animated by The Answer Studio Co., Ltd., and directed by Shunji Oga, who also did some storyboard work based on the Golgo 13 franchise.

The episodes are based on Duke Togo aka Golgo 13, an internationally known mercenary assassin, who is known by law enforcement agencies, criminals, terrorists and other factions around the world. He is notorious around the world as he is hired by many persons ranging from individuals, who can afford to hire him for an assignment, to foreign governments and secret organizations. The show details the various tasks that he undertakes and his encounters with various people.

The opening theme, Take The Wave, was performed by Naifu with the second opening theme So faraway performed by Pinc Inc played beginning from episode 26 with the exception of episode 19 and 21 since it used Take The Wave as its opening theme. For episodes 1 to 12, the ending theme song Garasu no Haiwei or Glass Highway was performed by doa, released in their album Prime Garden on November 19, 2008. The second ending theme song Yume no Hitotsu was performed by GARNET CROW with their single released on August 13, 2008. The third ending song Sono Hohoemi Yo Eien ni is performed by Aiko Kitahara from episodes 26 to 38. It was released a single on November 5, 2008. The fourth and final ending theme, "Mou Kimi wo Hitori ni Sasenai", was performed by U-KA Saegusa in DB with the single released on February 25, 2009.

Golgo 13 has already been released for the DVD. Volume 1 of the series has been released to the public on June 26, 2009. Volume 2 was released on July 24, 2009. Volume 3 has already been released on August 25, 2009. Volume 4 was released on September 25, 2009.

Aside from DVD releases, the show is also released on the UMD with a few select episodes taken from the series released publicly as Golgo 13: Best Selection. The first volume, released on June 26, 2009, includes episodes 15, 32, 39 and 49. The second volume was released on July 24, 2009 with episodes 14, 26, 33 and 34. The third volume was released on August 25, 2009.

The series has been licensed in North America by Sentai Filmworks, and distributed by Section23 Films. The first DVD set was released on July 13, 2010, with an English dub. The second set was released on September 14, 2010.  The English dub is currently streaming on the Anime Network.

Episodes

References
General

Specific

Golgo 13
Golgo 13